The Queen's Love Letter (German: Der Liebesbrief der Königin) is a 1916 German silent comedy film directed by Robert Wiene and starring Henny Porten, Arthur Schröder and Rudolf Biebrach. Its story is unconnected with Wiene's film The Queen's Secretary which was released the same year.

Cast
 Henny Porten   
 Arthur Schröder 
 Rudolf Biebrach   
 Paul Biensfeldt   
 Frida Richard   
 Heinrich Schroth

Bibliography
 Jung, Uli & Schatzberg, Walter. Beyond Caligari: The Films of Robert Wiene. Berghahn Books, 1999.

External links

1916 films
Films of the German Empire
German silent feature films
German comedy films
Films directed by Robert Wiene
German black-and-white films
1916 comedy films
Silent comedy films
1910s German films